Zhou Yuelong (born 24 January 1998) is a Chinese professional snooker player. He has been runner-up at three ranking events, the January 2020 European Masters, the 2020 Snooker Shoot Out, and the 2022 Northern Ireland Open.

Career
Between 2011 and 2014, Zhou was regularly selected to play in the wildcard round of Chinese ranking events. He could only win two of the nine he played in and was knocked out in the first round in both of those. Zhou won the 2013 IBSF World Snooker Championship which enabled him to join the snooker tour for the 2014–15 season.

2014/2015 season 
Zhou turned pro in 2014. His first win as a professional came at attempt number one as he defeated Alfie Burden 5–3 to qualify for the 2014 Wuxi Classic, where he lost 5–3 to Graeme Dott in the first round. Zhou defeated compatriot Liang Wenbo 6–2 to qualify for the International Championship and won his first ever match at a ranking event by eliminating Chris Melling 6–1, before being edged out 6–5 by Ricky Walden. He made his debut in a ranking event outside China at the UK Championship, but lost 6–1 to Jimmy Robertson in the first round. At the minor-ranking Xuzhou Open, Zhou saw off Barry Pinches to reach the quarter-finals where Thepchaiya Un-Nooh beat him 4–2. This helped him finish 15th on the Order of Merit. Zhou's second last 32 appearance at a ranking event this season came at the China Open and, after winning the first two frames, he lost 5–2 to David Gilbert. He was the world number 75 after his debut season on tour.

Zhou was selected to take part in the non-ranking 2015 Snooker World Cup with 15-year old Yan Bingtao as part of China's "B" team; China were allowed a second team as the hosts. They were 50/1 outsiders but topped their group, knocking out England in the process, and then in the knock-out stages beat Australia, Wales and Scotland in the final and pocketed a cheque of US$200,000 between them. Defeated finalist Stephen Maguire stated that he believed he had watched two future world champions.

2015/2016 season 
Zhou saw off Sam Baird 6–4 to qualify for the 2015 International Championship and beat Martin Gould 6–2 and Sanderson Lam 6–0 to reach the last 16 of a ranking event for the first time, where he lost 6–5 to Thepchaiya Un-Nooh. His World Cup win gained him entry into the Champion of Champions and he edged out reigning world champion Stuart Bingham 4–3, before losing 6–3 to Kyren Wilson in the quarter-finals. In the UK Championship Zhou defeated Craig Steadman 6–3, before exiting 6–1 in the second round to Shaun Murphy. He qualified for the China Open and lost 5–2 to John Higgins in the opening round. Zhou almost played in the World Championship for the first time, but was defeated in the final qualifying round 10–7 by compatriot Zhang Anda. He entered the top 64 in the world rankings for the first time at the end of the season, as he was 54th.

2016/2017 season 
Zhou got to the last 16 of the 2016 International Championship with wins over Anthony McGill and Mark Joyce, but lost 6–2 to John Higgins. He progressed through to the same stage of the UK Championship by defeating his World Cup partner Yan Bingtao 6–5 and was beaten 6–2 by Shaun Murphy. Zhou dropped just two frames in four matches at the Welsh Open to reach his first ranking event quarter-final, but was whitewashed 5–0 by Scott Donaldson. He beat Christopher Keogan 10–5, Ian Preece 10–8 and Ben Woollaston 10–9 to qualify for his first World Championship and said he hoped to draw Ronnie O'Sullivan in the opening round. Instead he faced Ding Junhui and was defeated 10–5. Zhou broke in to the top 32 in the world rankings for the first time at the end of the season.

2017/2018 season 
Zhou reached the semi-finals of a ranking event for the first time at the European Masters. He defeated Robbie Williams, Oliver Lines, Michael Georgiou, Peter Lines, and Anthony McGill, before losing 6–4 to Stuart Bingham. He has also reached the final of the Championship League (it was a non-ranking event), but lost 3–2 to John Higgins.

2018/2019 season 
In his match against Lyu Haotian at the Indian Open, Zhou made his first official maximum break in the fourth frame, but eventually lost the match 3–4. Zhou also qualified for the World Snooker Championship again after beating Robin Hull, Liam Highfield, and Eden Sharav in the qualifying rounds. He recorded his first win in the tournament by defeating Mark Allen 10–7, but lost to Ali Carter 13–9 in the second round.

2019/2020 season 
In January 2020, Zhou reached his maiden ranking final at the European Masters after wins over Mark Williams and Barry Hawkins, and Gary Wilson. The semi-final against Wilson started at 8pm and finished after midnight in a deciding frame. The following day Zhou was beaten by Neil Robertson 9–0 in the final, becoming the second player ever to be whitewashed in a two-session ranking event final. Zhou reached another ranking final in February, but lost to Michael Holt at the Shoot Out.

With the outbreak of COVID-19, Zhou returned to his home in west China. Facing a multitude of travelling and quarantine complications, he did not return for the resumption of the season, and missed the World Championship. He finished the season ranked 25.

2020/2021 season 
Zhou had a stellar performance in the UK Championship, reaching his first Triple Crown semi-final. After his win over John Higgins in the last 16, Higgins tipped him to become the next Chinese player to make a major breakthrough in snooker. Zhou made his second maximum break of his career at the Scottish Open in his win over Peter Lines.

At the World Championship Zhou, ranked 17, was the top seed in the qualification rounds. He beat Xu Si 6–5, after producing a remarkable clearance to level the scores 5-5. However, in the final qualifying round he lost to Liam Highfield 10–7. Zhou finished the season ranked 17.

2021/2022 season 
Zhou reached the quarter-finals of the second ranking tournament of the season, the British Open, losing in the deciding frame to Elliot Slessor. However, the rest of his season was comparatively unsuccessful. He missed three ranking events early in the season, and only reached the last 16 twice, in the German Masters and the Turkish Masters, losing to Judd Trump on both occasions. After Ding Junhui's fall from the top 16 at the UK Championship, Zhou was expected to make his Masters debut in January, but was pipped by compatriot Zhao Xintong. Zhou lost in the final qualifying round of the World Championship for the second year in a row to finish the season ranked 23, a drop of six places.

Performance and rankings timeline

Career finals

Ranking finals: 3

Non-ranking finals: 1

Pro-am finals: 2 (1 title)

Team finals: 4 (2 titles)

Amateur finals: 2 (1 title)

References

External links 

Zhou Yuelong at worldsnooker.com

Living people
Chinese snooker players
Sportspeople from Chengdu
1998 births
21st-century Chinese people